Daniel Speers (born 17 June 1997) is a retired English competitive swimmer who has represented Great Britain in the 2015 European Games.  Speers specialized in the 50-metre freestyle.

Career
Speers began swimming as a breaststroker, joining Bournemouth Dolphins in 2007. Speers took up freestyle as his main event shortly after joining Poole Swimming club. Head coach Robin Armayan, worked extensively on Speers' freestyle technique. In September 2013, Speers joined Millfield School where he was coached by Euan Dale and Jol Finck. Speers later represented Great Britain at the European Games, in his second year of Millfield, winning two relay medals. Speers swam at the University of Notre Dame under head coach Matthew Tallman.

See also
2015 European Games medal table
List of 2015 European Games medal winners

External links
Dan doubles up at the Olympic centre Dorset Echo, 2 Feb 2012
Costume hitch is no problem for Speers Bournemouth Echo, 9 Aug 2013
Daniel Speers' Notre Dame Biography
Get to know Daniel Speers, article by Notre Dame

References

Living people
Swimmers at the 2015 European Games
1997 births
British male swimmers
Sportspeople from Bournemouth
European Games medalists in swimming
European Games gold medalists for Great Britain
European Games silver medalists for Great Britain
University of Notre Dame alumni
People educated at Millfield